Hypoxynoticeras is an extinct genus of lower Jurassic ammonite that lived during Jamesoni zone of lower Pliensbachian. Animals belonging to this genus had small platycone shells, of which umbilicus made 25—30% of diameter. Keel was strong and ventrolateral shoulders were prominent. It is possible, that it was just a microconch, or juvenile of Radstockiceras.

Distribution
Fossils belonging to this genus were found in northern Germany, Poland, western Scotland and in England.

References

Oxynoticeratidae
Ammonitida genera
Jurassic ammonites of Europe
Pliensbachian life